"Levy-Dew", also known as "A New Year Carol" and "Residue", is a British folk song of Welsh origin traditionally sung in New Year celebrations. It is associated with a New Year's Day custom involving sprinkling people with water newly drawn from a well. The song was set to music by Benjamin Britten in 1934.

Lyrics
As with any traditional folk song, there are a number of variations. What is now regarded as the standard version is attested from 1849 onwards. Substantially the same wording was included by Walter de la Mare in Tom Tiddler's Ground (1931), an anthology of verse for children. De la Mare's version runs:

Benjamin Britten set the De la Mare version of the song to music as "A New Year Carol" in 1934.

Traditions
The song is associated with Pembrokeshire. There, it figured in a custom in which, on New Year's Day, children collect fresh water from a well, and go around with a sprig from an evergreen tree, which they use to sprinkle the faces of passers-by with the water while singing the carol and begging for gifts of food or money. Elsewhere in Wales, the custom is called , "new water", and the water was also used to lustrate rooms and doors of houses.

This ceremony has a parallel in the Scottish Hogmanay tradition of saining; here water drawn from a "dead and living ford", a ford crossed by both the living and the dead, is sprinkled through the house, and then juniper branches are burnt for the smoke indoors. The purpose of the rite is to sain, or purify, the house for the new year.

Interpretations

According to Trefor Owen, the song preserves "an early well-cult made acceptable to medieval Christianity by its association with the Virgin and perpetuated both by the desire to wish one's neighbour well at the beginning of a new year and by the small monetary payment involved." Similar speculations from the nineteenth century have sought to link the mysterious maidens of the song with the goddess Aurora, bearing the gold of the rising and setting sun on her head and feet.

The meaning of the words "levy-dew" in the original lyrics of the song is not certainly known. One line of speculation holds that the words represent the Welsh phrase llef ar Dduw or llef y Dduw, "a cry to God". Others connect it to Middle English  ("lady"), or to the French phrase levez à Dieu, "raise to God", which may in turn refer to the elevation of the Host in Christian liturgy.

Variant
The folk group Waterson–Carthy performed the song on their 2006 album Holy Heathens and the Old Green Man, but in this case the chorus begins "Residue, sing Residue". Martin Carthy's liner notes tentatively credit the variant wording to an informant from the East Riding of Yorkshire named Bert Hodgeson, and comment that "None of us can figure out the possible significance of the 'Residue sing Residue' chorus and neither could Bert – or whoever it was – but that was, he said, what was sung to him." The words may be a mondegreen. The recorded version also omits the stanza related to the water ritual, but adds two original verses in which the new year is welcomed through the south gate and the old year dismissed though the north gate.

References

Welsh folk songs
New Year songs
Compositions by Benjamin Britten